This is a list of rivers that are in whole or partly in the Northwest Territories, Canada.

By watershed

Arctic Ocean watershed
Back River (Nunavut)

Canadian Arctic Archipelago
Hornaday River (Nunavut)
Kagloryuak River (Nunavut)
Nanook River (Nunavut)
Roscoe River (Nunavut)
Thomsen River

Beaufort Sea watershed
Anderson River
Horton River (Nunavut)
Mackenzie River & watershed
Great Slave Lake watershed
Slave River (Alberta)
Salt River (Alberta)
Hay River (Alberta & British Columbia)
Yellowknife River
Cameron River
Taltson River
Lockhart River
Kakisa River (Alberta)
Horn River
Bouvier River
Redknife River 
Trout River
Jean Marie River
Spence River
Rabbitskin River
Liard River (Yukon & British Columbia)
South Nahanni River (Yukon)
Muskeg River
Kotaneelee River (Yukon)
Frances River
Harris River
Martin River
Trail River
North Nahanni River
Root River
Willowlake River
River Between Two Mountains
Wrigley River
Ochre River
Johnson River
Blackwater River
Dahadinni River
Saline River
Redstone River
Keele River
Great Bear River
Snare River
Great Bear Lake watershed
Bloody River
Whitefish River
Little Bear River
Carcajou River
Mountain River
Donnelly River
Tsintu River
Hare Indian River
Loon River
Tieda River 
Gillis River
Gossage River
Thunder River
Tree River (Nunavut)
Rabbit Hay River
Arctic Red River
Peel River (Yukon)
Ogilvie River
Blackstone River (Yukon)
Hart River
Rengleng River

Coronation Gulf watershed
Coppermine River (Nunavut)
Kendall River

Atlantic Ocean watershed

Hudson Bay watershed
Thelon River & watershed (Nunavut)
Elk River
Hanbury River

Alphabetical 

Anderson River
Arctic Red River
Back River
Blackstone River
Blackwater River
Bloody River
Bouvier River
Cameron River
Carcajou River
Coppermine River
Dahadinni River
Donnelly River
Elk River
Frances River
Gillis River
Gossage River
Great Bear River
Hanbury River
Hare Indian River
Harris River
Hart River
Hay River
Horn River
Hornaday River
Horton River
Jean Marie River
Johnson River
Kagloryuak River
Kakisa River
Keele River
Kendall River
Kotaneelee River
Liard River
Little Bear River
Lockhart River
Loon River
Mackenzie River
Martin River
Masik River
Mountain River
Muskeg River
Nanook River
North Nahanni River
Ochre River
Ogilvie River
Peel River
Rabbit Hay River
Rabbitskin River
Redknife River
Redstone River
Rengleng River
River Between Two Mountains
Root River
Roscoe River
Saline River
Salt River
Slave River
Snare River
South Nahanni River
Spence River
Taltson River
Thelon River
Thomsen River
Thunder River
Tieda River
Trail River
Tree River
Trout River
Tsintu River
Whitefish River
Willowlake River
Wrigley River
Yellowknife River

See also 
List of rivers of Canada

Northwest Territories

Rivers